Joe Soucheray is a radio talk-show host and newspaper columnist.  He produces his podcast Garage Logic from studios in Saint Paul, Minnesota.

Early life

Soucheray was born in Saint Paul, Minnesota in 1949. He attended St. Luke's as a grade schooler, Hill High School (now Hill-Murray School), and went to college at University of St. Thomas in the Twin Cities.

Newspaper career

Soucheray entered the media as a sports journalist, beginning work as a sports reporter for the Minneapolis Tribune in 1973. He joined the Saint Paul Pioneer Press in the mid-1980s and served for many years as a sports reporter and columnist, before becoming a general columnist in the mid-1990s.

Early radio career

In 1980, Soucheray entered the radio business, co-hosting Monday Night Sports Talk on KSTP radio with then-St. Paul Pioneer Press sports columnist Patrick Reusse. The show was known for its cast of callers doing impressions of various celebrities, in and out of the sports world, of widely varying quality - and, very occasionally, discussion about sports. The lack of actual sports content on "MNST" was a running gag between Soucheray, Reusse and the audience.

The show aired until the early nineties, until Soucheray began his daily "Garage Logic" program. The "Sports Talk" brand lived on in the duo's weekend show, "Saturday Morning Sports Talk" and has continued with the weekday version of "Sports Talk" which began airing on Monday, February 15, 2010. The pair claim it is the "longest-running sports talk show in history."

Garage Logic

Soucheray began hosting his daily Garage Logic drive-time radio show on KSTP on April 29, 1993. In it, Soucheray acts as the mayor of a mythical town bearing the same name as the radio show: Garage Logic, county seat of Gumption County. The motivating idea is to promote traditional values and is a sort of criticism of modern American pop culture and Minnesota's dominant liberal culture. Soucheray prefers to stick with the less philosophical slogan "Anything that needs to be figured out can be figured out in the garage."

Soucheray has been joined on the air by producer Matt "The Rookie" Michalski since the late 1990s. Rookie is the voice behind many skits and imitations on "Garage Logic" and "Saturday Morning Sports Talk".  Rookie was often held to mythical 6:00 pm meetings with Soucheray, after the conclusion of the show, if he angered Soucheray's character by not paying attention. More often, Soucheray could be heard asking Rookie if he actually listens to the show that he is producing.

The program has occupied several time slots during its run as the station's other programming has shifted, but for over a decade it, along with Rush Limbaugh's program, was part of a combination that made KSTP the dominant talk station in the market. With Limbaugh's departure from the station in 2006, Soucheray became KSTP's sole marquee talent.

After twenty-five years on the air, KSTP officially canceled Garage Logic on August 10, 2018. The final broadcast was aired on September 7, 2018. Joe signed off by thanking all the many fans saying, "You have all been heaven sent from above." Soucheray continued to produce Garage Logic as a podcast, with the first episode coming three days later. The podcast is also financed by Hubbard Broadcasting, the owners of KSTP.  The Garage Logic Podcast can be found by downloading the PodMN app, on Apple Podcasts, or wherever you get your podcasts.  It can also be found on www.GarageLogic.com

References 

American male journalists
American radio personalities
Radio in Minnesota
Living people
1949 births